Lin Chen-kuo (born 9 December 1937) is a Taiwanese politician who served as Minister of Finance between 1993 and 1996. He later chaired the Taiwan–Hong Kong Economic and Cultural Co-operation Council from 2010 to 2013.

Early life and career
Lin was born in 1937. His father, who had moved to Taiwan with an elder brother, was killed in the 228 Incident. As a result, an aunt helped his mother raise Lin and his eight siblings. Under their influence, Lin became a Christian at a young age. Though his grades were good, Lin did not do well on the university admissions exam. After further study, Lin was eventually admitted to National Taiwan University and graduated with a degree in economics. He then started work as a teacher's assistant, but expressed a desire to go into the seminary. His mother convinced Lin to continue teaching at NTU instead.

Political career
Shirley Kuo found Lin his first government job. He later led the finance departments of Taipei City Government and Taiwan Provincial Government. He was named finance minister under Premier Lien Chan in February 1993. Lin stepped down in June 1996, accepting an appointment as minister without portfolio. He later served as president of the China External Trade Development Council, leaving that position to head the newly established . In November 2009, Lin was named to the board of the Taiwan High Speed Rail Corporation, serving concurrently as chair of the company's audit committee. In 2010, the Taiwan–Hong Kong Economic and Cultural Co-operation Council was founded, and Lin became its first chairman.

References

1937 births
Living people
Taiwanese Christians
20th-century Taiwanese economists
Taiwanese Ministers of Finance
National Taiwan University alumni
Academic staff of the National Taiwan University